The 2007 Southern Miss Golden Eagles football team represented The University of Southern Mississippi in the 2007 NCAA Division I FBS football season. The team's head coach was Jeff Bower, who was in his 18th year at Southern Miss. Southern Miss played their home games at M. M. Roberts Stadium in Hattiesburg, Mississippi and competed in the East Division of Conference USA.

The Golden Eagles finished the season with a record of 7–6, 5–3 in C-USA play, and lost to Cincinnati, 31–21, in the PapaJohns.com Bowl.

Schedule

Roster

References

Southern Miss
Southern Miss Golden Eagles football seasons
Southern Miss Golden Eagles football